Edgardo Boné Baldi (15 July 1944 – 12 December 2016) was a former Uruguayan football player and manager.

Managerial career
He had coached teams in Bolivia, Nicaragua, Panama, Uruguay, Brazil and Suriname.
Baldi also had coached the Panama national football team and Suriname national football team in 1979 and 2003–04 respectively.

References

External links
https://web.archive.org/web/20140903072541/http://www.mega-agency.com/english/edgardobaldi.html

1944 births
Living people
Footballers from Montevideo
Uruguayan footballers
Uruguayan expatriate footballers
Uruguayan football managers
San Francisco F.C. managers
Panama national football team managers
Suriname national football team managers
Expatriate footballers in Bolivia
Expatriate footballers in Costa Rica
Expatriate footballers in Nicaragua
Expatriate football managers in Panama
Expatriate football managers in Suriname
Expatriate football managers in Bolivia
Expatriate football managers in Nicaragua
Expatriate football managers in Brazil
Expatriate football managers in Puerto Rico
Uruguayan expatriate sportspeople in Nicaragua
Association football midfielders
Club Deportivo Guabirá managers
Club Plaza Colonia de Deportes managers
Clube Náutico Capibaribe managers